The Nokia X2-01 is a low-cost feature phone with a Nokia S40 mobile operating system released under the X-series line of phones by Nokia. It features a full QWERTY keyboard. It is being advertised as an entry-level messaging and Music phone. It's similar to the Nokia X2-00, only differences are that it has a QWERTY keyboard, the display is landscape and has a downgraded VGA camera with no flash.

Features
Nokia X2-01 is a basic phone with installed extra features of Ovi Mail and Ovi Chat where users can set up email and chat accounts directly from the device. The X2-01 also has a VGA camera, 2.4-inch (61 mm) screen, and support for up to 8 GB of storage on a MicroSD card.
The phone is available in various colours: black-titanium, black-red, black-azure, white silver, white-pink. (Availability of some colours depends on the region).

Specifications
 General
 2G Network: GSM 850 / 900 / 1800 / 1900
 Announced: 2010, November
 Status: Available. Released 2011, January
 Body
 Dimensions: 119.4 x 59.8 x 14.3 mm, 86.6 cc
 Weight: 107.5 g
 Keyboard: QWERTY
 Dedicated music key
 Display
 Type: TFT, 256K colors
 Size: 320 x 240 pixels, 2.4" (61 mm) (~167 ppi pixel density)
 Sound
 Alert types: Vibration, Polyphonic(64), WAV, MP3 ringtones
 Loudspeaker: Yes
 3.5 mm jack: Yes
 Dedicated music key
 Cameras
 Primary: VGA, 640 x 480 pixels
 Video: Yes, QVGA@24 fps
 Secondary: No
 Features
 Messaging: SMS, MMS, Email
 Browser: WAP 2.0/xHTML, HTML (Opera Mini)
 Radio: Stereo FM radio with RDS
 Games: Yes plus downloadable
 GPS: No
 Java: Yes, MIDP 2.1
 Colors: Red, Deep Grey, Silver, Lilac, And Azure, white
 MP4/H.264/H.263/WMV video player
 MP3/WAV/WMA/AAC audio player
 Organizer
 Voice memo, and ability to keep track of notes 
 Predictive text input
 Battery
 Battery: Standard battery, Li-Ion 1020 (BL-5C)
 Stand-by: Up to 480 h
 Talk time: Up to 4 h 30 min

X2-01
Mobile phones introduced in 2011
Mobile phones with user-replaceable battery